Ángel de Andrés Miquel was a Spanish theatre actor and director.

Background

In 1938, after the Spanish Civil War broke out, the young Andrés worked as an amateur street actor and then as a "galán cómico" in the Salvador Videgain theatre company. In the following years, 1940 played roles in the Isbert, Infanta Isabel and María Guerrero theatre companies, among others.

Andrés began his own theatre company with Antonio Casal, which became very successful. It was there that Andrés met actress Chity Juárez.  Andrés and Juárez married in 1959 and remained together for the rest of Andrés' life. They had two children.

From 1939 until the 1990s, Andrés had regular jobs in theatre, cinema and television. He used his full name as his stage name, however, the people who knew him always called him Angelito de Andrés (Angelito is the familiar form for Ángel).

During the 1940s, Andrés began acting in movies as an extra, but it was not until 1950 that he was first cast serious roles. Throughout his career, Andrés worked by then in Portugal and Mexico. In the 1950s as a presenter and actor in radio and cinema.

Andrés' best performances came after Francisco Franco's death in 1975. In the 1980s, Andrés starred in numerous comedy films, winning the affection as a humorist and also in the TV series Celia and Lorca la muerte de un poeta of Juan Antonio Bardem. In the 1988 he played the character of Zenón de Somodevilla in Josefina Molina film's Esquilache with Fernando Fernán Gómez and Concha Velasco.

After suffering a paralysis due to a thrombus in the 1990s, he retired from the theaters, but not from television screens. In the summer of 2006, Andrés died in his sleep from a heart attack.

Selected filmography
 Fin de curso (1943) by Ignacio F. Iquino
 Turbante blanco (1943)
 Thirsty Land  (1945)
The Prodigal Woman (1946) by Rafael Gil
 Unknown Path (1946) by José Antonio Nieves Conde
 Confidencia (1947) by Jerónimo Mihura
 The Faith (1947) by Rafael Gil
 The Sunless Street (1948)
 Jalisco canta en Sevilla (1948) by Fernando de Fuentes
 Mare Nostrum (1948)
 Don Quijote de la Mancha (1948) by Rafael Gil
 ¡Fuego! (1949) by Arthur Duarte
 Just Any Woman (1949)
 I Want to Marry You (1951)
 Tercio de quites (1951) by Emilio Gómez Muriel
 Fantasía española (1953) by Javier Setó
 Historias de la radio (1955) by José Luis Sáenz de Heredia
 Manolo guardia urbano (1956) by Rafael J. Salvia
 Un Abrigo a cuadros (1957) by Alfredo Hurtado
 El Hincha (1958) by José María Elorrieta
 Pasa la tuna (1960) by José María Elorrieta
 091 Policía al habla (1960) by José María Forqué
 You and Me Are Three (1962) by Rafael Gil
 Las Estrellas (1962) by Miguel Lluch
 Tomy's Secret (1963) (1963) by Antonio del Amo
 La Pandilla de los once (1963) by Pedro Lazaga
 Batalla del domingo, La. (1963) by Luis Marquina
 Fin de semana. (1964) by Pedro Lazaga
 Mi canción es para ti (1965) by Ramón Torrado
 He's My Man! (1966) by Rafael Gil
 Padre Manolo, El (1966) by Ramón Torrado
 Another's Wife (1967) by Rafael Gil
 Aquí mando yo (1967) by Rafael Romero Marchent
 The Sailor with Golden Fists (1968) by Rafael Gil
 De Picos Pardos a la ciudad (1969) by Ignacio F. Iquino
 ¡Se armó el belén! (1969) by José Luis Sáenz de Heredia
 Con ella llegó el amor (1970) by Ramón Torrado
 Don Erre que erre (1970) by José Luis Sáenz de Heredia
 Secuestro a la española (1972) by Mateo Cano
 Casa Flora (1973) by Ramón Fernández
 Reprimido, El (1974) by Mariano Ozores
 No quiero perder la honra (1975) by Eugenio Martín
 And in the Third Year, He Rose Again (1980)
 Brujas mágicas (1981) Mariano Ozores hijo
 Cristóbal Colón, de oficio... descubridor (1982) Mariano Ozores hijo
 The Autonomines (1984) by Rafael Gil
 Juana la loca... de vez en cuando (1983) by José Ramón Larraz
 El Cid cabreador (1983) by Angelino Fons
 Libro Luces de bohemia (1985) by Miguel Ángel Díez
 Esquilache (1988) by Josefina Molina
 La forja de un rebelde, (1990) by Mario Camus
 Celia (1993) by José Luis Borau

Sources
 La auténtica vida e historia del teatro. Juan José Videgain (2005).  
 La revista (1997) Ramón Femenía
 Diccionario de Teatro Akal (1997)
 Prensa nacional española entre 1940 y 2005: ABC, El Alcázar, Pueblo, Digame, Ya, El país, El mundo, La razón...
 Teatralerias, tres siglos de la escena, (2018) Madrid: P & V.

References
 

1918 births
2006 deaths
Spanish male film actors
Spanish male stage actors
Spanish male television actors
20th-century Spanish male actors
Spanish theatre directors
Male actors from Madrid
Burials at Cementerio de la Almudena